The Guiers is a river in the Isère and Savoie departments of eastern France. It rises in the Chartreuse Mountains. The part upstream from the confluence with the Guiers Vif (literally Live Guiers) is also called Guiers Mort (literally Dead Guiers).

References

Rivers of France
Rivers of Auvergne-Rhône-Alpes
Rivers of Savoie
Rivers of Isère